Balandin is a small crater that is located on the far side of the Moon. It lies within the large walled plain Gagarin, close to the eastern rim.

Balandin is circular with a somewhat unusual hummocky interior floor, similar to the nearby Kosberg, to Barbier F within Barbier, or to Van den Bos.  It is adjacent to slightly smaller (unnamed) craters to the east and west.

References

External links

LTO-103A1, Lunar Topographic Orthophotomap, Grave

Impact craters on the Moon